Pakistan have participated in the ABU Radio Song Festival twice. The Pakistani broadcaster, Pakistan Broadcasting Corporation, has been the organiser of the Pakistani entry since the country's debut in the contest in 2012.

History
Pakistan Broadcasting Corporation is one of the founder members in the ABU Radio Song Festivals, having participated in the very first ABU Radio Song Festival 2012.

Participation overview 
Table key

References 

Countries at the ABU Song Festival
Pakistani music